Sanachan may refer to:

A Japanese manga comic, Sana's Stage: see Kodocha
A settlement on the shore of Loch Kishorn in Scotland: see Loch Kishorn